Yamoussa Camara may refer to:
 Yamoussa Camara (politician)
 Yamoussa Camara (footballer)